With a climate as varied and extreme as India, the people require a myriad of options to keep their thirst appropriately quenched according to the weather conditions, varying from steaming hot drinks during winters to frosty cold drinks in summers. Different regions in the country serve drinks made with an eclectic assortment of ingredients including local spices, flavors and herbs. Available on the streets, as well as on the menus of posh hotels, these drinks add to the flavorful cuisine of India.

Consumption statistics by drink type 

This is the consumption of drinks per capita per year in India in 2021 by drink type excluding water and juices.

Assorted drinks 

 Aam panna – made from raw mango
 Aamras
 Bael sharbat
 Banta soda, carbonated lemonade sold in codd-neck bottle
 Buransh – made from rhododendron flowers with jelly like consistency, Uttarakhand
 Ela neeru / karikku - tender coconut water
 Fruit juice
 Gaajar ka doodh - made from grated carrot and sweetened milk
 Ganne ka ras or sugarcane juice
 Gud-nimbu sharbat – made of lemon and jaggery
 Jal-jeera
 Jigarthanda, famous in Madurai
Kahwah is common drink in cold regions of Jammu and Kashmir
Kala Khatta
 Kanji
 Kesar kasturi
 Khas Khas drink - mad from poppy seeds 
 Khus sharbat - made from Vetiver syrup
 Kokum sharbat
 Kulukki sharbat - shaken Lemonade
 Liyo
 Lemonade 
 Nannaari (Sarsaparilla) sharbat – lemon-based drink, Tamil Nadu
 Nariyal Pani (Coconut water)
 Neera
 Ookali – hot drink made by boiling coriander seeds, Western India
 Panakam - Beverage made of jaggery and lemon juice, traditionally served on Rama Navami. 
 Paneer soda, carbonated lemonade mixed with rose essence and sold in codd-neck bottle is a variation of Banta soda
 Phalsa sharbat – made from Grewia asiatica
 Pudina sharbat – made from mint
 Ramula – a drink made from sweet potato
 Rasna, a soft drink concentrate 
 Rooh Afza, a concentrated drink
 Sakar-loung Pani – made from rock sugar and clove; famous in Gujarat, Rajasthan
 Sattu paani – famous in North India
 Saunf paani, from Gujarat
 Sharbat – drink that has many variants
 Shikanjvi - traditional lemonade, often mildly spicy
 Solkadhi
 Sugandha water
 Tnkaw Toraaṇi - a rice based drink from Odisha

Dairy drinks

Flavoured milk

 Badam milk – almond-flavoured milk
 Kesar milk – saffron-flavoured milk
 Rose milk - Rose sharbat - flavoured milk
 Sugandha milk

Milk-based beverages

 Ambil or Ambli – prepared by using ragi flour and buttermilk, Maharashtra and Karnataka
 Buttermilk – Lassi or Laasi in North India, chhachh or Chaas or Chaah in North India, mor in Tamil, majjiga in Telugu, majjige in Kannada, and taak in Marathi
Chai with cream – prepared using dry or fresh variants of tea, often has hints of cardamom (elaichi), cinnamon (dalchini) or a mixture of spices, which constitute the special masala chai, taken especially during the cold to keep the winter-related problems at bay
 Doodh soda – a Punjabi mixture of milk and lemon-lime soda
 Haldi doodh or hot turmeric milk
 Lassi – a popular, traditional, yogurt-based drink from Northern India. It is a blend of yogurt, water, spices and sometimes fruit. 
Traditional lassi (a.k.a., "salted lassi", or simply "lassi") is a savoury drink, sometimes flavoured with ground and roasted cumin. 
Sweet lassi, however, contains sugar or fruits, instead of spices. Banarasi Lassi: Varanasi, one of the prominent cities of Bhojpur region is known for special variation of Lassi, popularly known as Banarasi Lassi'. The Curd for Banarasi Lassi is made with reduced milk which gives it a creamy & thick texture. It is then sweetened, churned and served with generous blob of Rabdi in earthen pots called Kulhads.

 Mastaani, Pune
 Sharjah Shake – A sweet, cold beverage made from milk, Horlicks/other malt powders and njalipoovan. Sometimes, ice cream, cocoa powder or nuts may be added.
 Sambaram – Salted buttermilk made from cow's milk spiced with shallot, freen chili pepper, ginger and curry leaves from Kerala
 Thandai

Hot drinks 

Both tea and coffee contain caffeine and tannin. Comparatiely, coffee has more caffeine and less tannin than tea, whereas tea has more tannin and less caffeine than coffee.

Coffee
 Indian filter coffee – a sweet milky coffee made from dark roasted coffee beans (70–80%) and chicory (20–30%)
 Instant coffee

Tea

 Assam tea
 Ayurvedic teas, various types of Indian herbal teas
 Temi tea
 Darjeeling tea
 Balma green tea
 Berinag tea
 Black tea
 Green tea
 Seven-colour tea
 Irani chai
 Kangra tea
 Masala chai
 Noon chai
 Nilgiri tea
 Tulsi tea
 Milk tea

Flavoured tea
 Butter tea
 Elaichi tea or cardamom tea
 Ginger tea
 Lemon tea
 Tejpatta Tea

Intoxicating drinks

Traditional

The alphabetised list of native traditional drinks is as follows:

 Akani- palm sap from Tamil Nadu.
 Apo – traditional drink from Arunachal Pradesh made from fermented rice
 Arrack-distilled from a wash of palm Jagger, herbs etc. from Kerala
 Bangla –  a distilled country liquor made from starch and sold in West Bengal by government licensed vendors.
 Bhang thandai
 Bhang lassi – prepared from leaves and buds of female cannabis plant
 Bitchi – a drink consumed mostly by Garo tribals
 Chhaang or Tongba – drink from Sikkim made from grain millet
 Cholai
 Chuak – a drink from Tripura made from rice, jackfruit and pineapple
 Desi daru
 Feni – an alcoholic beverage made from cashew apple or coconut in Goa
 Gudamaba – brewed from sugar cane in Hyderabad 

 Handia - rice beer popularly consumed in Jharkhand
 Hariya
 Kaid Um – drink in Meghalaya, consumed mostly by Khasi and Jaintia tribes
 Kallu – coconut palm sap from Kerala
 Kodo Ko Jaanr – also known as chyang, prepared from finger millet

 Laopani (also called Haanj) – made from fermented rice in Assam, concentrated extract is called Rohi.

 Lugdi – made from rice, Manali
 Mahua – made from mahua flowers, Central India

 Mandia pej – made from ragi powder and stale water from boiled rice, popular in Odissa
 Manri – made from fermented rice, popular in Mithila

 Pendhā

 Rohi – pale yellow coloured extract of Laopani fermented rice drink of Assam, usually offered to the ancestors, priests or elders on special occasions.

 Sekmai – from the state of Manipur; made from sticky rice.
 Sonti
 Sulai
 Sunda Kanji – made from fermenting rice that is buried in earthen or mud pots covered with cloth, sold in Tamil Nadu, India.
 Sura

 Thaati Kallu
 Tharra
 Toddy/Tadi/Kallu (palm wine) 
 Urrak
 Zawlaidi – popular in Mizoram prepared from rice, millet and maize.
 Zutho – from Nagaland

Non-Traditional 

Alphabetised list of non-traditional drinks in India.

 Indian beer
 Indian brandy
 Indian-made foreign liquor
 Indian rum
 Indian vodka
 Indian whisky
 Indian wine
 Lion beer, Asia's first beer brand produced at Kasauli Brewery since 1930, brewery was established by Edward Abraham Dyer, father of Colonel Reginald Edward Harry Dyer "The Butcher of Jallianwala Bagh massacre".
 
 Old Monk, well-known rum produced since 1954.
 Solan No. 1, India's first single malt whiskey produced at Kasauli Brewery since 1930 which was started by Edward Abraham Dyer.

See also

 List of Indian dishes
 Lists of drinks

References

Drinks
Indian
Drinks